Nicolas Gaël Bayod (born 7 March 1982) is a retired French professional footballer. LB Châteauroux, Nîmes Olympique, and Clermont Foot.

External links
 Profile at Soccerway

1982 births
Living people
Association football midfielders
French footballers
Ligue 2 players
Toulouse FC players
LB Châteauroux players
Nîmes Olympique players